Saginaw Valley State University is a state university in Michigan in the United States. The College of Arts and Behavioral Sciences was the original College at the University when it was established in 1963.

Undergraduate programs
 Applied studies 
 Art 
 Communication 
 Creative writing 
 Criminal justice 
 English 
 Gender studies* 
 Gerontology* 
 Graphic design 
 History 
 International studies 
 Music 
 Philosophy* 
 Political science 
 Pre-social work 
 Professional and technical writing 
 Psychology  
 Public administration 
 Social work 
 Sociology 
 Theatre 
 Youth services*

Programs marked with an asterisk are only available as a minor

Graduate programs
 Communication and multimedia (MA) 
 Administrative science (MAS)

Language Programs
 French 
 German* 
 Polish* 
 Spanish

External links
 College of Arts and Behavioral Sciences

Saginaw Valley State University
Liberal arts colleges at universities in the United States